Empire Chancellor was a  tanker which was built in 1945 by Sir J Laing & Sons Ltd, Sunderland for the  Ministry of War Transport (MoWT). In 1946 she was sold into merchant service and renamed Stanglen. Further sales saw her renamed Newminster in 1952 and Stanpark in 1954. In 1959 she was sold and renamed Granny Suzanne. She was scrapped in 1960.

Description
The ship was built by Sir J Laing & Sons Ltd, Sunderland. She was launched in 1945 and completed in July 1945.

She had a GRT of 9,917 and a NRT of 5,922.

The ship was propelled by a 2-stroke Single Cycle Double Acting diesel engine, which had five cylinders of  diameter by  stroke. The engine was built by the North East Marine Engine Co (1938) Ltd, Newcastle upon Tyne. It developed  at 105 rpm.

History
Empire Coleridge was built for the MoWT. She was placed under the management of J A Billmeir & Co Ltd. Her port of registry was Sunderland. The Code Letters GJWD and United Kingdom Official Number 169020 were allocated.

In 1946, Empire Chancellor was sold to the Stanhope Steamship Co Ltd and renamed Stanglen. She remained under the management of J A Billmeir. In 1952, she was sold to the Minster Steamship Co Ltd and renamed  Newminster. She was operated under the management of Mitchell, Coutts & Co. She was sold back to Stanhope Steamship Co Ltd in 1954 and renamed Stanpark. In 1957, the Arab League blacklisted Stanpark for "carrying strategic material" to Israel.  In 1959 she was sold to Tsavliris Shipping Co, London, and renamed Granny Suzanne. The ship was scrapped in 1960 at Piraeus, Greece.

References

1944 ships
Ships built on the River Tees
Tankers of the United Kingdom
Steamships of the United Kingdom
Ministry of War Transport ships
World War II tankers
Empire ships
Merchant ships of the United Kingdom